Jelgava (see also other names) is a state city in central Latvia about  southwest of Riga with 55,972 inhabitants (2019). It is the largest town in the region of Zemgale (Semigalia). Jelgava was the capital of the united Duchy of Courland and Semigallia (1578–1795) and the administrative center of the Courland Governorate (1795–1918).

At high water the plain and sometimes the town as well can be flooded. It is a railway center and is also host to Jelgava Air Base. Its importance as a railway centre can be seen by the fact that it lies at the junction of over 6 railway lines connecting Riga to Lithuania, eastern and western Latvia, and Lithuania to the Baltic sea.

Name 

Until 1917, the city was officially referred to as Mitau. The name Jelgava is believed to be derived from the Livonian word jālgab, meaning "town on the river." The origin of the German name Mitau is unclear, although it is suggested that it came from the Latvian words mīt or mainīt, meaning "to exchange" or "to trade," thus making it "trading-place." An alternate explanation is that Mitau came from Mitte in der Aue, German for "the middle of the Aa", referring to the Lielupe River, formerly known as the Courland Aa (Kurländische Aa in German). 

In Yiddish, the city was known as מיטאַווע (Mitave) or מיטאַו (Mitar).

In publications dating from the Soviet period, the city name was occasionally spelled in English as "Yelgava", a back-transliteration from Russian Елгава.

History 

The Livonian settlement began developing in the Mitau locality between the rivers Lielupe and Driksa during the 10th century. Led by the Grand Master , the crusading Livonian Order constructed the castle in Mitau on a natural island fortification (Pilssala) in 1265–1266. Using Mitau as a southern fortress, the German knights subdued the surrounding Livonians and Semigallians by 1290. The town rose in importance as a defensive fixture against the Lithuanians to the south, who succeeded in plundering Mitau in 1345.

As a result of the fall of the Livonian Order in the Livonian War of 1558-1583, Mitau became a town of the Duchy of Courland in 1561. Mitau received city rights in 1573, and became the capital of the united duchies of Courland and Semigallia in 1578. When the Duchy of Courland split in 1596, Mitau became the residence of Duke Friedrich Kettler of Semigallia. The city again became the capital of the united duchies in 1617. Because the duchy became a vassal of the Polish–Lithuanian Commonwealth from 1561, Mitau was also referred to by the Polish name Mitawa. The Commonwealth's repeated wars with Sweden subjected Mitau to several sieges. Despite the wars, the city grew as a center for trade and industry. As Courland's neighbors increased in strength, however, the duchy and Mitau began to fall under Russia's sphere of influence.

The Tsar of Russia, Peter the Great, received a promise from duke  Friedrich Wilhelm that he would marry one of the daughters of the tsar's late half-brother. In 1710, Friedrich Wilhelm married Anna Ioannovna (later Empress of Russia), but on his way back from St Petersburg, he took ill and died (1711). Anna ruled as the duchess of Courland from 1711 to 1730.

The penultimate duke of Courland, Ernst Johann von Biron, expanded the cultural aspects of Mitau. He constructed the ducal palace and opened the first public library in the city. In 1775 the last Duke of Courland, Peter von Biron, founded the Academia Petrina, which became a cultural center for the country. The duke also encouraged theatrical performances at his court.

With the outbreak of the French Revolution in 1789, the citizens of Mitau clamored for more rights. Later, Imperial Russia annexed the city as part of Courland in 1795 during the Third Partition of Poland. As the seat of the Count of Provence, the palace of Mitau was the residence (1798–1801 and 1804–1807) of Louis XVIII before he became the French king in 1814. Although the city was occupied by  Prussian troops during the Napoleonic Wars, it was largely spared destruction.

Mitau further expanded after the  construction of its railway in 1868. The development of its infrastructure encouraged rural Latvians to migrate to the city, as merchants, craftsmen, teachers, and officials. By 1914 Mitau had over 45,000 inhabitants. However, Mitau suffered considerably after the outbreak of World War I in 1914. The spirited defence of Mitau by two battalions of the Latvian Home Guard in 1915 helped inspire the formation of the Latvian Rifles.  German troops occupied the city during the war, and British prisoners of war, sent there as forced labour, suffered atrocious conditions and treatment. After the war, in 1919, Mitau became a battleground between Bolshevik Red Guards, German  paramilitaries, and Latvian freedom-fighters. After the  victory of the latter group in November 1919, Mitau, renamed to Jelgava, became an important city in independent Latvia. In 1925 a sugar factory was built in Jelgava, the first such factory in Latvia. In 1939 Latvia University of Life Sciences and Technologies opened in the Jelgava Palace.

As a result of the Nazi-Soviet Pact of 1939, Jelgava was occupied and annexed with the rest of Latvia by the Soviet Union in 1940. Many of the city's remaining German population were resettled into the territory of German-occupied Poland during the Nazi–Soviet population transfers. German forces from Army Group North occupied Jelgava from 1941 to 1944 until the capture of the city by the Red Army. During World War II, German police along with Latvian auxiliary police murdered the Jewish inhabitants of the city during a series of mass shootings (see Jelgava massacres). The main synagogue was burned to the ground.

In late July 1944, the Soviet Red army launched an attack from the south in the direction of Jelgava and Tukums to encircle the German Army Group North. Jelgava was declared a fortress (Festung) however, there were only a few scattered German and Latvian units in the city. From 30 July until 7 August, after heavy street fighting and several air raids, the Red Army managed to occupy the left bank of the Lielupe river. In late August, the German army launched a counterattack on Jelgava from the north but it failed to drive back the Soviets. Jelgava remained on the frontline until 10 October when the German army retreated to Courland.
The city's historic centre, industry, rail network, and public buildings were heavily damaged by the fighting, with almost 90% of the city destroyed. Among lost buildings was famous Kurland Provincial Museum and Athenaeum.

Jelgava was rebuilt in typical Soviet style after World War II as part of the Latvian SSR. Jelgava became home to several big factories. Among them were the sugar factory, which was heavily expanded from 1975 assembly line, and administration buildings for the Riga Autobus Factory (RAF).
Following Latvian independence, Jelgava has slowly regained its original Germanic heritage and is now a popular tourist site. Owing to Latvia University of Life Sciences and Technologies, many of Jelgava's inhabitants are students or people connected with education. For this reason Jelgava is sometimes called the Student capital of Latvia.

Climate

Demographics 
As of 1 January 2022, the city had a population of 54,694.

Sights 

Jelgava before the Second World War had regular, broad streets lined with the mansions of the Baltic German nobility who resided at the former capital of Courland. The old castle (1266) of the dukes of Courland, situated on an island in the river, was destroyed by Duke Biren, who had a spacious palace erected (1738–1772) by Bartolomeo Rastrelli at the bridge across the Lielupe. The palace contains the sarcophagi of almost all of the Curonian dukes, except the last one. The future Louis XVIII sojourned in the palace between 1798 and 1800. It now functions as Latvia University of Life Sciences and Technologies.

In addition the following cultural and historical objects can be seen: Jelgava Palace (Lielā Street 2), Jelgava Old Town, Cathedral of the Immaculate Virgin Mary (Katoļu Street 11), St Simeon and St Anne's Cathedral (Raina Street 5),  (Jāņa Street 1), Jelgava Baptist Church (Matera Street 54), Love Alley (Dobele highway),  (Rīgas Street 22), Jelgava Station (Stacijas Street 1).

Culture 

Jelgava regularly hosts an international Ice Sculpture festival, Student Folk Festival, Easter Walk, Latvian Plant Days, Business Days, Jelgava City Festival, Summer solstice in Jelgava, medicine market, International Cat Show "Jelgava Cat", Sports Day, International Sand Sculpture Festival,  and Milk Packet Boat Regatta, Beginning of the School Year, Metal Festival, Azemitologa Festival, Autumn fair " Miķeļdienas waiting", Latvian Amateur Theater Festival "Jokes come from the actor", Student Days, Proclamation Day of the Republic of Latvia s celebrations, New Year's Eve.

The following museums operate in the city:  Jelgava History and Art Museum, historical expositions  tower,  museum exposition in Jelgava Castle "Tombs of the Dukes of Kurzeme and Zemgale", Latvian Railway Museum Jelgava exposition, psychiatric hospitals "" museum,  exposition.

Libraries:  (Akadēmijas Street 26), Pārlielupe Library (Loka highway 17), Miezīte Library (Dobele highway 100), children's library "Zinītis" (Lielā Street 15).

Parks 
Green territories and parks: Jelgava Castle Park, Station Park, Rainis Park, Duke Jacob's Square, Square in Mātera Street, Alunāns Park, Svētbirze, Ozolpils Park, Valdeka Park, Ozolskers, Victory Park, Jelgava Psychoneurological Hospital Park, Lielupe floodplain meadows, Grēbner Park, forest near RAF residential area, forest near Jelgava bypass.

Sports 
The city's main football team, FK Jelgava, plays in the Latvian Higher League and has won the Latvian Football Cup four times.

Notable people 

Aleksejs Auziņš (1910–1997) – footballer, coach, ice hockey player
Johann Heinrich Baumann (1753-1832) - painter
August Johann Gottfried Bielenstein (1826–1907) – linguist, folklorist, ethnographer
Peter von Biron (1724-1800), Duke of Courland
Vilnis Edvīns Bresis (1938-2017), politician
Jan Krzysztof Damel (1780-1840), painter
Andrejs Dūda (born 1981), swimmer
Karl Eichwald (1795–1876), geologist, paleontologist and physician
Johannes Engelmann (1832-1912), jurist
Ieva Gaile (born 1997), figure skater
Kristīne Gaile (born 1997), figure skater
Kaspars Gerhards (born 1969), politician
Johannes von Guenther (1886–1973), writer
Joseph Hirshhorn (1899–1981), entrepreneur, financier and art collector
Olga Jakušina (born 1997), ice dancer
Elise von Jung-Stilling (1829-1904), painter
Edijs Jurēvics (born 1989), rocksinger and guitarist
Renārs Kaupers (1974), Latvian singer
Friedrich Kettler (1569-1642), Duke of Courland
Frederick Casimir Kettler (1650-1698), Duke of Courland
Ferdinand Kettler (1655-1737), Duke of Courland
Frederick William, Duke of Courland (1692-1711), Duke of Courland
Maria Amalia of Courland (1653-1711), Landgravine of Hesse-Kassel
Wilhelm Kettler (1574-1640), Duke of Courland
Adolph Theodor Kupffer (1799-1865), chemist, and physicist
Dzintars Lācis (1940-1992), cyclist
Natalia Laschenova (1973) Olympic team gold medalist (gymnastics)
Max Lazerson (1887-1951), politician
Friedrich Ludwig Lindner (1772-1845), German writer, journalist and physician
Jānis Lūsis (1939–2020), Latvian (and Soviet) athlete — javelin thrower
Paul von Medem (1800-1854), diplomat
Friedrich von der Pahlen (1780-1863), diplomat and administrator.
Elza Radziņa (1917–2005), Latvian actress
Johann Friedrich von Recke (1764-1846), senior public official in the Baltic Germans Duchy of Courland.
Einars Repše (1961), Latvian politician
Friedrich von Rüdiger (1783-1856), Baltic German military officer in service of the Russian Empire and a general of the Imperial Russian Army.
Princess Pauline, Duchess of Sagan (1782-1845), Duchess of Sagan
Princess Wilhelmine, Duchess of Sagan (1781-1839), Duchess of Sagan
Vitālijs Samoļins (born 1990), chess player
Igors Šaplavskis (born 1968), boxer
Carl Christian Joseph of Saxony, Duke of Courland and Semigallia (1759–1763)
Paul Schiemann (1876–1944), journalist, editor and politician
Carl Schmidt (1822-1894), chemist
Artūrs Skrastiņš (1974), stage and film actor
Gatis Sprukts (born 1996), ice hockey player
Mamert Stankiewicz (1889–1939), the captain of the Polish merchant marine
Feodor Stepanovich Rojankovsky (1891–1970), illustrator
Eduard Totleben (1818–1884), Russian military engineer
Ernst Rudolf von Trautvetter (1809-1889), botanist
Gunars Upatnieks (born 1983), musician
Inese Vaidere (born 1952), politician
Johann Walter-Kurau (1869-1932), painter
Kaspars Znotiņš (1975), stage and film actor

Twin towns – sister cities

Jelgava is twinned with:

 Pärnu, Estonia (1957)
 Šiauliai, Lithuania (1960)
 Vejle, Denmark (1992)
 Białystok, Poland (1994)
 Xinying (Tainan), Taiwan (2000)
 Alcamo, Italy (2002)
 Baranavichy, Belarus (2003)
 Hällefors, Sweden (2004)
 Nacka, Sweden (2004)
 Rueil-Malmaison, France (2006)
 Magadan, Russia (2006)
 Ivano-Frankivsk, Ukraine (2007)
 Nova Odessa, Brazil (2007)
 Como, Italy (2016)

See also
Adolfa Alunāna Theatre
Jelgava massacres

References

External links

 Map of Jelgava
 City paper

 
Capitals of former nations
Cities in Latvia
Republican cities of Latvia
Doblen County
Semigallia
Holocaust locations in Latvia
Populated places established in the 10th century